General elections were held in Costa Rica on 12 February 1928. Cleto González Víquez of the National Union won the presidential election, whilst the party also won the parliamentary election, in which they received 53.3% of the vote. Voter turnout was 62.5% in the presidential election and 72.85% in the parliamentary election.

Background
On January 6, 1926 the delegates of the Agricultural Party, which was the second most voted party in the previous elections, met at the Moderno Theater of San Jose where they met the resignation of their leader and presidential candidate Alberto Echandi Montero,  deciding to constitute a new political organization called the National Union Party, a name that had previously been used to bring Ascension Esquivel Ibarra to power, but which preserves the agricultural green flag (since Esquivel had used a white flag). The party nominated former President Cleto González Víquez, who had also been a diplomat and minister during the Esquivel administration. González also receives the adhesion of the Reformist Party and of the supporters of Máximo Fernández, self-styled "Historical Republicans".

For his part, the candidate of the Republican Party is Carlos María Jiménez Ortiz, deputy and chief of action, proclaimed on January 7, 1927 at the Teatro América by the Republican convention. Once the candidates have been designated, the Diario de Costa Rica emphasizes that the ideological differences between both are virtually null.

There is also a reelection movement that sought to reform the Constitution to allow the consecutive re-election of Ricardo Jiménez Oreamuno, to which Don Ricardo emphatically rejected: "... what would remain the preachings of my whole life in defense of democratic and republican principles? . I prefer a mediocre president of the Republic to the most brilliant of dictators."

Campaign
The Republicans attacked González Víquez accusing him of belonging to "The Olympus", the generation of intellectuals who had dominated the country for several decades and of having been an illegitimate ruler in his first election. They signaled him as a dark and conspiratorial figure in politics, who had squandered state resources and received bribes when he held public office and even that he was too old to be president.

But Jimenez Ortiz also has his adversaries, especially the Reformists because he and Father Jorge Volio, the head of reformism, were enemies, and this causes that Jiménez Ortiz can't give a speech in Santa Ana for the boycott of the Reformists. Neither did he have the full support of all Republicans, some of whom were inclined towards González Víquez.

Don Ricardo Jimenez Oreamuno, as president, had the power to organize the elections. Jiménez promised to make them as transparent as possible. The secret ballot had recently been approved and was implemented for the first time in this election. It was also established that the use of the telegraph would be free that day to file electoral complaints.

Results

President

Parliament

References

1928 elections in Central America
1928 in Costa Rica
Elections in Costa Rica